The 1996 Spengler Cup was held in Davos, Switzerland from December 26 to December 31, 1996.  All matches were played at HC Davos's home arena, Eisstadion Davos. The final was won 6-2 by Team Canada over HC Davos.

Teams participating
 Team Canada
 HC Davos
 Rochester Americans
 Jokerit
 Leksands IF

Tournament

Round-Robin results

Finals

External links
Spenglercup.ch

1996-97
1996–97 in Swiss ice hockey
1996–97 in American ice hockey
1996–97 in Canadian ice hockey
1996–97 in Finnish ice hockey
1996–97 in Swedish ice hockey
December 1996 sports events in Europe